Piy-Khemsky District (Bii-Xem kojuun) is an administrative and municipal district (raion, or kozhuun), one of the seventeen in the Tuva Republic, Russia. It is located in the north of the republic. Its administrative center is the town of Turan, Tuva Republic. Population:  11,431 (2002 Census);  The population of Turan accounts for 49.4% of the district's total population.

References

Notes

Sources

Districts of Tuva